Long Hưng may refer to several commune-level subdivisions in Vietnam, including:

Long Hưng, Cần Thơ, a ward of Ô Môn District
Long Hưng, An Giang, a ward of Tân Châu, An Giang
Long Hưng, Biên Hòa, a commune of Biên Hòa
Long Hưng, Gò Công, a commune of Gò Công in Tiền Giang Province
Long Hưng, Bình Phước, a commune of Phú Riềng District
Long Hưng, Hưng Yên, a commune of Văn Giang District
Long Hưng, Sóc Trăng, a commune of Mỹ Tú District
Long Hưng, Châu Thành, a commune of Châu Thành District, Tiền Giang Province

See also
The communes of Long Hưng A and Long Hưng B in Lấp Vò District, Đồng Tháp Province